The City of Tshwane Metropolitan Municipality (also known as the City of Tshwane) is the metropolitan municipality that forms the local government of northern Gauteng Province, South Africa. The Metropolitan area is centred on the city of Pretoria with surrounding towns and localities included in the local government area.

History
The City of Tshwane Metropolitan Municipality was established on 5 December 2000, comprising 13 former city and town councils and managed under an executive mayoral system.

The Metsweding District Municipality was incorporated into the municipality with effect from 18 May 2011 (the date of the 2011 municipal elections).

Geography

The Tswaing crater is in the northwest of Soshanguve.

Constituent areas
The City of Tshwane Metropolitan Municipality consists of the following areas:

 Akasia
 Atteridgeville
 Bronberg
 Bronkhorstspruit
 Centurion
 Crocodile River
 Cullinan/Rayton/Refilwe
 Eersterust
 Ekangala
 Elands River
 Ga-Rankuwa
 Hammanskraal
 Laudium
 Mabopane
 Mamelodi
 Olievenhoutbosch
 Pretoria
 Soshanguve
 Rethabiseng
 Roodeplaat
 Soshanguve
 Temba
 Winterveld
 Zithobeni

Main places
The 2011 census divided the municipality into the following main places:

Demographics
There were around 2,921,500 (2011 census) people living within the borders of Tshwane: 75.40% black, 20.08% white, 2.01% coloured and 1.84% Indian or Asian.

Ethnic group 2011 census

Ethnic group 2011 census (age 0–4)

Politics

The municipal council consists of 214 members elected by mixed-member proportional representation. 107 are elected by first-past-the-post voting in 107 wards, while the remaining 107 are chosen from party lists so that the total number of party representatives is proportional to the number of votes received. In the election of 1 November 2021, no party won a majority of seats on the council.

The following table shows the results of the 2021 election.

The Executive

On 23 November 2021, Randall Williams (DA) was re-elected as executive mayor of the City of Tshwane. Murunwa Makwarela (COPE) was elected unopposed as the new City of Tshwane Speaker of Council on 20 January 2022. The City is currently led by a majority coalition (109 seats) consisting of the Democratic Alliance, ActionSA, Freedom Front Plus, Congress of the People, Inkatha Freedom Party and African Christian Democratic Party. Williams resigned in February 2023.

Services

Water and sanitation
As of 2016, City of Tshwane receives 72% of its bulk water from Rand Water, which utilizes the Integrated Vaal River System. The remaining 28% of Tshwane's water is sourced from its own treatment plants and boreholes. Water restrictions are implemented during drought, heat waves or other seasonal changes.

Transport

Railway
The main rail station is in Pretoria.

The Gautrain runs through parts of the municipality, with stations in Centurion and Pretoria, ending at a station in the suburb of Hatfield.

Airports
OR Tambo International Airport in neighbouring Ekurhuleni Metropolitan Municipality serves Tshwane. Wonderboom Airport in the north of Tshwane serves light aircraft.

Education

Tertiary education

The Tshwane municipality is home to the Tshwane University of Technology, and the largest distance education university (the University of South Africa, more commonly known by its acronym, UNISA), as well as The University of Pretoria, one of South Africa's leading research and teaching universities, Sefako Makgatho Health Sciences University (SMU, previously called University of Limpopo (Medunsa Campus) and Medical University of Southern Africa-MEDUNSA) a medical school, and the South African Council for Scientific and Industrial Research (CSIR).

Military

Air Force
The South African Air Force military bases AFB Waterkloof and AFB Swartkop are in Centurion.

Thaba Tshwane Military Base
Thaba Tshwane military base  (formerly called Voortrekkerhoogte and before that Roberts Heights) is in the municipality.

Memorials
The SANDF memorial is at Fort Klapperkop and the South African Air Force memorial is at AFB Swartkop.

Society and culture

Media

Museums
There are a large number of museums, many of them in Pretoria.
 Pretoria Forts
 Kruger House (residence of the president of the ZAR, Paul Kruger)
 Mapungubwe Collection
 Melrose House (the Treaty of Vereeniging which ended the Anglo-Boer War was signed here in 1902)
 Voortrekker Monument
 Freedom Park
 Transvaal Museum
 African Window
 South African Air Force Museum

Festivals
The city of Tshwane hosted the 10th World Choir Games, organised by the Interkultur Foundation, between 4–14 July 2018. Various locations across the city were used as venues to host concerts and ceremonies for the event, including the Musaion and Aula theatres at the University of Pretoria, the ZK Matthews Great Hall at the University of South Africa, and the Pretoria State Theatre. The event was the first of its kind on the African continent.

Sporting venues

 Lucas Moripe Stadium, Atteridgeville
 HM Pitje Stadium, Mamelodi
 Loftus Versfeld, Pretoria
 SuperSport Park, Centurion
 Odi Stadium, Mabopane
 Giant Stadium, Soshanguve

Scout Groups 
 1st Nan Hau Scout Group
 5th Hillcrest/Colbyn Scout Group
 6th St Andrews Scout Group
 7th Mamelodi Scout Group
 8th St Albans Scout Group
 9th Irene Air Scout Group
 10th Arcadia Scout Group
 13th St Patricks Scout Group
 14th Delp Scout Group
 22nd Waterkloof / Kosmos Sea Scout Group
 23rd Lyttleton Scout Group
 35th Pretoria Sea Scout Group
 36th Sinoville Scout Group
 37th Springvale Scout Group
 40th Glenstantia Scout Group
 41st Parks Scout Group
 42nd Laudium Scout Group
 46th Midstream Scout Group

Sport 
The city is home to the Tshwane Suns who compete in South Africa's highest basketball division, the Basketball National League.
There are two Premier Soccer League teams, Mamelodi Sundowns and Supersport United. Pretoria University, known as Tuks plays in the second-tier league. Tshwane is also home to the Blue Bulls rugby team.

City name change

Tshwane  is the Setswana/Sepedi name of the Apies River, which flows through the city. The origin of the name of the river is unclear. It may mean "place -e of the black cow, tshwana, from ceremonies where a black cow was sprinkled with water from the river to end a drought. Another claim is that it was named after Tshwane, son of Chief Mushi, an Ndebele leader who settled near the Apies River about a century before the arrival of the Voortrekkers in the early 19th century.

Two other common explanations are demonstrably untrue. One is that it is the Tswana for the motto of Tshwane Municipality, "We are the same". However, this appears to be promoted for its emotional value; if anything, it would mean "we are not the same" in Tswana (ga re tshwane). Another common misunderstanding is that it is the Tswana word for "little monkeys"; although it resembles the Tswana word for baboon, tshwene, "little monkeys" is actually the translation of the Afrikaans name "Apies".
     
In 2005, politicians in the South African capital voted to rename the city Tshwane and retain the name Pretoria for the city centre only.
The Sunday Times used the word Tshwane to refer to the Pretoria area for a short period in 2005. The state-controlled SABC also started using the term in its evening news broadcasts, for a period, but by 2010, had reverted to "Pretoria". Private media outlets continued to refer to the metropolitan area as Pretoria. The Pretoria News, the main newspaper in the metropolitan area did not appear to have plans to change its name as of early 2006, although it has adopted the slogan "The paper for the people of Tshwane".  
       
On 21 May 2005, the Pretoria Civil Action Committee, a group consisting of business, labour, cultural, civil and political leaders opposed to the name change organised a protest in the Pretoria city centre. They marched to the office of Arts and Culture Minister Pallo Jordan and handed him a petition signed by 3,000 University of Pretoria students as well as other petition documents. Former president FW De Klerk, a Nobel prize winner and the last president under apartheid, also raised concerns about the change.

In November 2005, the Advertising Standards Authority found that advertising proclaiming that Tshwane, rather than Pretoria, was the capital of South Africa was misleading.

The Pretoria name change
On 5 December 2000, a number of old Pretoria municipalities, as well as others that fell outside the Greater Pretoria area, were combined into one area called the City of Tshwane Metropolitan Municipality. The city of Pretoria remained largely intact in this municipality.  On 26 May 2005, the South African Geographical Names Council unanimously approved a recommendation by the Tshwane Metro Council that the name Pretoria be changed to Tshwane.

The legal process involved is as follows:
 Recommendation to the Geographical Names Council.
 Council approves/rejects recommendation (approved 26 May 2005).
 Council gives its recommendation to Arts and Culture Minister Pallo Jordan.
 Minister approves/rejects recommendation.
 Approved/rejected name is published in the Government Gazette.
 Any person or body unhappy with the name change can complain within one month of above.
 The minister can consult the Geographical Names Council with concerns raised.
 The minister's decision, along with the reasons for it, are published
 The minister will then take the matter before parliament where the central government will decide on whether to change the name or not based on the information before it.

Some groups attached themselves to the Pretoria name change issue, including the trade union Solidarity, which, along with the Pretoria Civil Action Committee, threatened legal action should the name change be recommended by the minister. In early August 2007, it was reported in the press that the municipality, after consulting with the Gauteng provincial government had withdrawn the application to change the name, and was instead contemplating a plan to change all road signs pointing to "Pretoria" to "Tshwane" or the "City of Tshwane" across the country. This plan raised threats of legal action from both political groupings opposed to the renaming, and concerns from municipal officials about the possibility of vandalism to the proposed signs.

In 2010, the Ministry of Arts and Culture prepared to publish the registration of Tshwane as a place name, in the Government Gazette. However, the registration was withdrawn at the last minute, which was explained by the minister.   Although it was too late to remove the name from printing in the Government Gazette, the retraction of the name registration was published the following week in the gazette. In November 2011, Kgosientso Ramokgopa, who had been elected mayor earlier that year, vowed to push forward with the renaming in 2012.

Management and corruption
As in other parts of the country, the Tshwane Metropolitan Municipality experiences high levels of corruption. Significant resources of the Special Investigation Unit (SIU) were dedicated to this region since 2010. The screening of applicants for management positions has also been criticized.

When, by November 2020, businesses and residents owed the metro R12 billion, the metro outsourced its credit management to 34 debt collecting agencies after normal means were ineffectual. This was expected to increase the metro's income levels, cash flow and capacity for service delivery. In 2021, its debt with Eskom stood at over R200 million, and the utility labeled it as a municipality with a poor payment record. When in August 2022 its debt stood at R1.152 billion, Eskom warned that the city's electricity may be disconnected.  

In February 2022, its debtors book stood at R17 billion and Tshwane implemented the Tshwane Yatima project to disconnect the power and/or water supply to 420 businesses, besides that of some state departments (Public Works and Infrastructure owing R355 million) and embassies, SARS, the Navy and SAPS headquarters and Hatfield Gautrain station due to non-payment of their electricity or municipal accounts. The University of Pretoria paid the bill of its Hillcrest campus under protest at the last minute.

See also
 Pretoria
 Media in Pretoria
 Rainbow Junction

References

External links
Official City of Tshwane Website
Hospitality Portal to Centurion, Gauteng
Visit Pretoria Guide to Pretoria

 
Metropolitan municipalities of Gauteng